The Korg DW-8000 synthesizer is an eight-voice polyphonic hybrid digital-analog synthesizer 61-note keyboard instrument released in 1985. By the time of its launch, Korg had already begun a common trend in 1980s synthesizer design: using numerical codes to access or change parameters (synth "voice", tone, etc) with its predecessor - the Korg Poly-61, which was widely regarded as the company's first "knobless" synthesizer.  This was a move away from the heavily laden, complex control panels of earlier designs.

A more unusual feature of the instrument for the time was the use of single-cycle digital waveforms as the basic building block of sound synthesis, and the inclusion of a digital delay effect. This delay effect was a significant factor in the relative success of the DW-8000 compared to the cheaper DW-6000 released earlier the same year.

Physical characteristics
Physically, the instrument used a 61-note synthesizer action keyboard. "Synthesizer action" means that it did not have weighted or semi-weighted keys, a common feature on stage pianos marketed at pianists. The DW-8000 keys were velocity sensitive. As such, a light press triggered a quieter sound and a hard press triggered a louder sound. As well, its keys could sense channel-pressure aftertouch as well. Aftertouch is the placing of pressure on keys after the initial striking or pressing of the keys. On a digital keyboard with aftertouch sensitivity, when the performer continues to press the keys, the aftertouch sensors send a message to the synth module; depending on the programming of the synth patch and/or the settings selected by the performer, aftertouch can trigger a digital effect (e.g., vibrato) or a change in the timbre (tone colour). The keyboard sends aftertouch messages via MIDI if required.  

A four-way joystick was provided to control low-frequency oscillation (LFO) modulation as well as pitch bending.  Pulling the joystick bender towards you also allowed control over voltage-controlled filter (VCF) as well.  Around the back panel are jacks for headphones, stereo line out (to plug into a keyboard amplifier, PA system, mixing board, etc.), pedal inputs for damper, portamento and "program up" are provided.  Also available are two sockets for tape recorder interface to facilitate offline patch backup and storage of sounds and other data.  Electrical power was supplied via a two-pin IEC C9-type connection cable rather than the rather more ubiquitous C13 type, which can potentially be a source of frustration if lost.

Patch storage and backup
The instrument has 64 memories which can be backed up to cassette tape in similar fashion to that used for home computers of the time. This system can be prone to error or mishap as the availability of the "verify" feature for the tape backup system can attest to.  The instrument does, however, possess the capability in MIDI to SysEx transfer provided you have a computer with suitable software that can send the MIDI dump request message to it.

A more reliable alternative to the cassette tape interface is a portable CD, sound player or computer with WAVE files saved on disc (although, in this last case, using SysEx files is faster and saves space). 

An optional accessory was the MEX-8000, a hardware device which can provide extra storage.

DWGS synthesis

As basic material, sixteen digital wave cycle waveforms were available to the user through a system Korg called DWGS for Digital Waveform Generator System.  The system can be thought of as an early sample playback system where only extremely short, single cycle waveforms are stored on four 256 Kilobit ROM chips, played back through the two free running digital oscillators and processed by relatively familiar subtractive synthesis facilities.  The waveforms themselves were the usual staple sine, sawtooth, and pulse waveforms, but more unusually featured waveforms such as emulations (imitations) of acoustic piano and saxophone.  To aid the user in appropriate selection, each of the sixteen wave samples are printed on the right-hand end of the operating panel along with the parameter reference below.  Any two of the digitised waveforms could be used by the two digital oscillators provided.  A noise source could be added separately to add further timbre or tone colour.

Oscillator modes
The synthesizer makes use of two polyphonic modes and two monophonic modes.  Each of the two monophonic modes arranged the oscillators into a single note stack of slightly detuned oscillators.  Use of these two monophonic modes changes the character of any given patch quite considerably, generally imbuing it with what could best be described as a powerful or "fat" sound.

Analog VCA and VCF stages
Whilst the source sounds were digital, the subsequent major sound shaping stages consisted of an analog variable-gain amplifier (VGA) enveloper using six stages and similar arrangement also for the analogue filter.  The filter is unmistakably analog and can be pushed into self-oscillation using the filter-resonance parameter.   Further modulation of the sound could be applied using the single LFO which could either modulate oscillators to produce vibrato effect, the filter, or even both at the same time should such be desired.  A significant creative limitation of the DW-8000 architecture was that the user could not control the LFO depth with respect to each oscillator, as they were both modulated in common.

Digital delay effects
The final key part of the architecture was the digital delay section, which provided an effect unit that could be applied to the sound.  As the rest of the synthesizer architecture up to this point in the sound chain was analogue, the signal had to be converted back to a digital signal so that it could have the effect applied.  This fact is evident in the increased noise when using the delay effect.  Despite this, it was a flexible digital delay that gave times ranging from 2 to 512 milliseconds in length. Delay effects are similar to reverb. Added to this was a modulation depth parameter so the user could create chorus and flanging effects as well as delay.

Arpeggiator section
While contemporary synthesizers with built-in sequencing facilities were quite rare in 1985, the DW-8000 included a 64-note arpeggiator with an optional latch function and an "assignable" mode which allowed the user to cumulatively add up to 64 notes to the arpeggiator's input.  The arpeggiator also includes options to span multiple octaves and an adjustable tempocontrol slider.

Historical assessment
While DW-8000 may not have represented a great leap in synthesis, the hybrid architecture of digital waveforms through analog filters was to become an important approach used in Korg keyboards during the second half of the 1980s.  Other manufacturers were developing instruments using similar ingredients of samples and effects, though still using traditional subtractive synthesis with better technology.  The Korg DW-8000 was monotimbral and had trouble competing with the Roland D-50 and MT-32 introduced two years later, which used samples of real attack transients to synthesize increasingly realistic acoustic instrument sounds. The MT-32 also introduced multitimbral capabilities, with relatively high quality onboard effects.  Korg took longer to develop a competitive synthesizer, but by the end of the decade achieved considerable success with their M1 workstation keyboard which included 14 of the 16 DWGS waves from the DW-8000.

References

External links
 Vintage Synth Explorer
 DW-8000.COM
 Korg DW-8000 Central: FAQ, HOWTOs, Manuals, and Patches
 Midimetric UniSynth : DW/EX-8000 Windows Editor
 New patches from AnalogAudio1
 Korg DW-8000 Info, Manuals, and Patches
 Polynominal | Review, tech details and sound clips

D
Polyphonic synthesizers
Analog/digital hybrid synthesizers